David O'Hare and Joe Salisbury were the defending champions but only Salisbury chose to defend his title, partnering Leander Paes. Salisbury lost in the final to Jeevan Nedunchezhiyan and Christopher Rungkat.

Nedunchezhiyan and Rungkat won the title after defeating Paes and Salisbury 6–4, 3–6, [10–7] in the final.

Seeds

Draw

References
 Main Draw
 Qualifying Draw

RBC Tennis Championships of Dallas - Doubles
2018 Doubles